The Madhesi Jana Adhikar Forum, Nepal (Loktantrik), was a political party in Nepal. It existed as one of the important political force during the constituent assembly. Later the party merged with several other parties to become the largest Madhesh/Tharuhath based party, Nepal Loktantrik Forum.

History

Formation 
The party was formed after Upendra Yadav expelled Bijay Kumar Gachhadar and six other members after his agreement to join the new CPN (UML)-led government. As a result, the former party was split with 26 among 52 members of constituent assembly opposing Yadav's decision. The MJFN (L) included former leaders of other political parties like the Nepali Congress and Nepal Sadbhawana Party who were from democratic background.

The party was registered with the Election Commission of Nepal shortly after the 2008 Constituent Assembly election due to mass ideological differences in mother party with majority of democratic background while few being leftist.

First constituent assembly 
The party had 26 members in the first constituent assembly. All of them were the one who sided with Gachhadar opposing the authoritarian character of Upendra Yadav.

Second constituent assembly 
The party fought the second constituent assembly on its own and won 14 seats. The party won 4 seats from FPTP system while won 10 seats from proportional representation. As a result, the party stood as the largest Terai Madhesh based party in the assembly.

The party merged on April 5, 2017 with the Rastriya Janamukti Party (Loktantrik) and Dalit Janajati Party to form Nepal Loktantrik Forum.

Leadership

Chairman 

 Bijay Kumar Gachhadar

Deputy chairman 

 Rameshwar Raya Yadav

General secretary 

 Mrigendra Kumar Singh Yadav 
 Jitendra Narayan Dev

Election results

See also  

 Madhes Movement 
 Bijay Kumar Gachhadar

References 

Political parties in Nepal